Finalmente soli is an Italian sitcom. It is a spin-off of Io e la mamma. After the closing of the series, three TV-movies were produced between 2007 and 2008.

Cast 

Gerry Scotti: Gigi Mantelli
Maria Amelia Monti: Alice Fumagalli
Rosalina Neri: Wanda
Nicola Pistoia: Spartaco Ceccacci
Pino Ammendola: Gambardella 
Francesca Rettondini: Cinzia
Milena Miconi
Sylvie Lubamba

See also
List of Italian television series

External links
 

Italian television series
Canale 5 original programming